Nowhere to Run is a 2015 Chinese suspense thriller film directed by Wang Mengyuan. It was released on March 13, 2015.

Cast
 
Liu Ying 
Ge Tian 
Sui Yongliang 
Qian Sitong 
Du Yuting 
Tu Yuwei 
Yuchi Shaonan

Reception
By April 13, the film had earned  at the Chinese box office.

References

2010s thriller films
Chinese thriller films
Chinese suspense films